Thelosia phalaena is a moth in the Apatelodidae family. It was described by William Schaus in 1896. It is found in Brazil (Rio de Janeiro).

The wingspan is 30–45 mm. The forewings are dark reddish brown without markings. The hindwings are speckled with chrome yellow scales.

References

Natural History Museum Lepidoptera generic names catalog

Apatelodidae
Moths described in 1896
Moths of South America